Antarcticoolithus is an oogenus of large fossil eggs from the Maastrichtian part of the Lopez de Bertodano Formation of Seymour Island, Antarctica. The genus contains the type species A. bradyi, described by Legendre et al. in 2020. The fossil egg, the first found in Antarctica, was discovered in 2011 by a Chilean team of researchers. They named the egg fossil "The Thing" in reference to the movie. The fossil measures .

Description 

The fossil egg is visibly collapsed and folded and is characterized by a thin eggshell with a layered structure that lacks a prismatic layer and distinct pores. The oofossil is similar to that of most extant lizards and snakes (Lepidosauria). The identity of the animal that laid the egg is unknown, but these preserved morphologies are consistent with the skeletal remains of mosasaurs found nearby. The large egg with a relatively thin eggshell may indicate a reproductive investment linked with gigantism, and lepidosaurian viviparity, in which an egg is laid and hatches immediately.

See also 
 La Meseta Formation
 South Polar region of the Cretaceous
 Mussaurus

References

Bibliography 
 

Egg fossils
Maastrichtian life
Cretaceous Antarctica
Fossils of Antarctica
Fossil parataxa described in 2020